GlycomeDB is a database of carbohydrates including structural and taxonomic data.

See also
Glycomics

References

External links
 http://www.glycome-db.org

Biological databases
Omics
Glycomics
Carbohydrate chemistry
Carbohydrates
Sugar